Maheshwar Assembly constituency is one of the 230 Vidhan Sabha (Legislative Assembly) constituencies of Madhya Pradesh state in central India.
Dr. Vijayalaxmi Sadho represents the constituency in the Madhya Pradesh Vidhan Sabha.

It is part of Khargone District.

Members of the Legislative Assembly

See also
 Maheshwar

References

Assembly constituencies of Madhya Pradesh